Od ani holeh (Hebrew: עוד אני הולך) or Still Walking is a book and a film based on the book. It is from film director Yaky Yosha's first novel, published in Hebrew in March 2008. The novel was followed by a film based on the story. Production began in the summer of 2008 in Tel Aviv. According to Yosha: "Still Walking" is Shalom's older brother, and show the same youngsters pondering over the social and political state they live in, when they're a generation older. The film, following the book, will track them down when all is without hope."

Plot summary
The narrative takes place in Tel Aviv, at the dawn of the 2006 Lebanon War. Mickey, an ex–Special Forces officer, and ex-Shabak agent (Israeli Security Services), has spent the night in a casino, losing a fortune. Now, at 4 AM, Mickey is lying in a rainy, darken alley, having a severe heart attack.

While Mickey recovers, we find out that he is married to Laura, presently an alcoholic, and formerly—like most characters entangled in this story—a vivacious, beautiful and promising young individual. We also find out that Absalom, his son, both condemns and loves him, and that he is involved with Olga, a Russian immigrant and former prostitute. We find out that Mickey was shamefully released from his elite unit, for inappropriate compassion—sparing a young Arab terrorist, and later from the Shabak, for unjustified cruelty—killing an innocent Arab, father of six.

We follow Mickey as he discovers that his family, mistress, and brothers in arms cannot prevent him from sinking into the pit he dug for himself. We watch as Mickey struggles to compensate for his transgressions, while eluding the mafia goons that are after him for his gambling debts.

References 

 The content of this article was translated from :he:עוד אני הולך (ספר) (Still Walking) in the Hebrew-language Wikipedia, acknowledged here under terms of the GNU Free Documentation License.

External links 
 

2008 novels
21st-century Israeli novels
Novels set in Israel
Israeli novels adapted into films
2008 debut novels